Kairouan Governorate is one of the twenty-four governorates of Tunisia. It is landlocked and in the centre-east of the country. It covers an area of 6,712 km2 and has a population of 570,559 (2014 census).  The narrower province of Sousse borders it to the east, the nearest coastline The capital is Kairouan.  Lowland parts of the province are semi-arid, experiencing in most years light rains in the winter months and scant rainfall in other months but higher parts attract relief precipitation in and around the Djebel Zhagdoud and a large part of the Djebel Serj national parks, in the north-east of the province which are geologically outcrops of the Dorsal Atlas mountains in the province to the north.

Administrative divisions
The Kairouan Governorate is divided into eleven delegations (mutamadiyat), listed below with their populations at the 2004 and 2014 Censuses, and further sub-divided into sectors (imada).

Twelve municipalities are included within Kairouan Governorate:

Nature reserves
 Aïn Chrichira

References

 
Governorates of Tunisia